Delores J. "Dee" Knaak (née McComber) (July 13, 1929 – February 9, 2020) was an American educator and politician.

Knaak was born Delores Jean McComber in Hibbing, Minnesota and graduated from Hibbing High School and Hibbing Junior College. She went to St. Cloud State University. Knaak lived in White Bear Lake, Minnesota and taught in elementary school. Knaak served on the Ramsey County Commission. Knaak served in the Minnesota Senate from 1977 to 1980 and was a Republican. Knaak then served on the Minnesota Public Utilities Commission from 1991 to 1996. Knaak died in Maplewood, Minnesota. Her son was Fritz Knaak who also served in the Minnesota Legislature.

Notes

1929 births
2020 deaths
People from Hibbing, Minnesota
People from White Bear Lake, Minnesota
St. Cloud State University alumni
Educators from Minnesota
American women educators
Women state legislators in Minnesota
County commissioners in Minnesota
Republican Party Minnesota state senators
Hibbing High School alumni
21st-century American women